Meek (born 1978, Melbourne, Australia) is a notable street artist operating out of Melbourne, Australia, and specialising in the subgenre of stencil graffiti.

Meek started putting up street art in early 2003 and enjoys the irony of his name in a subject area that is all about bragging and boasting.

He lived in London for some time and was exposed to the work of Banksy. As well as stenciling prolifically, Meek has also hijacked billboards, and used wheat paste and stickers.

The book Stencil Graffiti Capital devotes a chapter to Meek. Other books that display his works are Stencil Pirates by Josh McPhee, Conform by Saskia Folk and Street art uncut by Matthew Lunn. 
Meek also appears in feature documentary RASH 2005, a film which explores the cultural value of street art in Melbourne, Australia.

His work has been exhibited in:
 Melbourne Stencil Festival, 2005
 BACKWOODS – An Exhibition of the EVERFRESH STUDIOS, Wooden Shadow Gallery, Richmond (VIC), 21 April 2007
 National Gallery of Art, Canberra, Australia

See also 
List of Australian street artists
Types of graffiti
Spray paint art

References

External links 
Stencil Graffiti Capital: Melbourne
Stencil revolution (Meek's gallery)
 Remote Control (Video of commissioned mural)
 another Meek site
 RASH on Mutiny Media website

Living people
1981 births
Artists from Melbourne
Australian graffiti artists